The Paraavis Acrobat is a Russian single-place paraglider that was designed and produced by Paraavis of Moscow. It is now out of production.

Design and development
The Acrobat was designed as an intermediate glider.

Specifications (Acrobat 26)

References

Acrobat
Paragliders